The 2018 Sri Maha Mariamman Temple riot was a rioting incident that took place for two days from 26 to 27 November 2018 at the Seafield Sri Maha Mariamman Temple site and also the surrounding area at USJ 25, Subang Jaya, Petaling, Selangor. The riot stemmed from a misunderstanding between the temple and the developer, One City Development Sdn. Bhd. in the issue of the transfer of the temple. As a result, the riot incident resulted in damage to public property and the death of a firefighter, Muhammad Adib bin Mohd Kassim. The riots had already received public attention and widespread coverage in the Malaysian mass media.

Incident

The first riot 
On 26 November 2018 around 2.40 am, the Subang Jaya District Police Headquarters (IPD) Operations Room received a call from the public about the commotion incident at the temple. Immediately after receiving the report, the Subang Jaya District Police Chief ordered the police to move to the scene. At about 2.50 am, four police multi-purpose vehicles (MPVs) arrived at the scene but were barred from entering by a group of Indian men. The action caused the rear window of one of the MPVs that arrived to be broken while a trailer truck was parked horizontally to block the path leading to the temple. Therefore, at 3.30 am, the Subang Jaya District Police Chief contacted the Federal Reserve Unit (FRU) and the Serdang IPD to seek additional assistance from members. Serdang IPD assistance arrived at the scene at 4.00 am.

At that point, the first riot erupted when there was a fight inside the temple between temple devotees and a group of Malay thugs who invaded the temple area until some were seriously injured. However, some of the thugs fled from the temple grounds after the fight broke out. Shortly after the incident, the Hindus involved set fire to several vehicles which were believed to be owned by the group of Malay men. A total of 18 vehicles were on fire. Around 5.00 am later, firefighters arrived at the scene to control the fire. The FRU team arrived at the scene at 5.30 am to quell the riot. The situation around the temple became under control by noon and the situation calmed down. Following the fights and riots that occurred, three Malay men and three Indian men were injured while a policeman was also injured.

Around 1.00 pm, a foreign man believed to be a construction worker was raided and beaten by the crowd until he was injured after allegedly starting a fire in a shared house in the temple area. The atmosphere around the temple, which was initially calm, turned chaotic again as a result of the action and to some extent, some people even blocked the police vehicle. The situation regained control after the man was rescued through a police vehicle and a team of FRU members patrolled the location. Firefighters then arrived to put out the fire in the shared house.

Chairman of the Task Force of the temple of S. Ramaji has claimed that the invasion was carried out around 2.00 am conducted by about 250 people from among the Malays and foreigners armed with knives, machetes, axes, sticks and others. Meanwhile, the Selangor Police Chief reported that 17 suspects had been arrested in connection with the unrest around the temple. The Deputy Inspector General of Police stressed that the riots had nothing to do with racial issues.

The second riot 
Then in the late afternoon of 26 November, the crowd regrouped and this situation led to a second riot in the early morning of 27 November which was joined by about 10,000 Indians. During the riot, several more vehicles were set on fire by rioters. Firefighters who arrived at the fire area were also stopped and attacked by rioters. The group of rioters attack the developer's premises around 2.00 am at Menara MCT, about 1 kilometre from the temple, causing several vehicles to suffer damage and fire. This tension caused guests of nearby hotels to be evacuated to a safer place.

There was also a viral video footage showing two motorcyclists being beaten by rioters while passing through the street in front of the temple but were rescued and they lodged a police report shortly thereafter. The injuries they received were found to be mild. At 9.00 am, a survey around the temple and the developer's premises found that the situation had calmed down and was under control as guaranteed by the Selangor Police Chief, Datuk Mazlan Mansor.

Around 10.45 pm, there were about 80 Malays assembled and marched towards the main road in front of the temple, although the police had made a fortress to stop their advance and control the group. They were eventually ordered to disperse. Nine men who joined the rally were detained by police after they ignored orders to disperse by police. The situation around the temple was brought back under control and the police continued to search for the suspects involved to assist in the investigation into the cause of the riots. The Prime Minister, Tun Dr Mahathir Mohamad has stressed that the riot incident in the temple area is a crime and not a racial or religious issue.

Attack on the firefighters 
The second riot also saw the serious injury of an emergency respondent, Muhammad Adib bin Mohd Kassim, who was a firefighter based at the Subang Jaya Fire Station. Adib was one of nine respondents to the second temple riot that was attacked when they arrived in the area in an attempt to put out the fire, and he was the only one to suffer injuries as a result of being beaten by a group of unknown rioters. His colleague, Mohd Hazim bin Mohd Rahimi accidentally left Adib in the riot area because Hazim himself said that he was also attacked by other rioters with sharp weapons and the fire brigade had to withdraw from the riot area. A fire engine was also damaged by rioters. Although there were claims made that the firefighter was injured as a result of being hit by the fire engine, this allegation was later refuted by the Director General of the Fire and Rescue Station, Mohamad Hamdan Wahid.

Initially, Adib was assisted by several Hindus present at the temple and was later sent to Ramsay Sime Darby Medical Center (also known as Subang Jaya Medical Center) for treatment. As a result of his deteriorating health, Adib was later transferred to the National Heart Institute (IJN) as he needed the use of an ECMO machine. While Minister of Housing and Local Government, Zuraida Kamaruddin visited the severely injured firefighter, she was reported to have said that Adib had been “beaten and trampled” causing a broken rib and internal injuries. Health Minister, Dzulkefly Ahmad reported that Adib's health was improving while undergoing treatment. Adib was also visited by the Sultan of Kedah on 29 November 2018 because he is from Kedah.

Although Adib was initially reported to be recovering well, Adib eventually died of lung failure on the night of December 17 while still in intensive care at IJN. He was later buried at the As-Saadah Mosque Islamic cemetery in Kampung Tebengau, Kuala Kedah on 18 December 2018. His name and service number were then written on the 'Fallen Heroes' Bomba monument in Kuala Kubu Bharu, Selangor to commemorate the services and sacrifices of the deceased firefighter.

Aftermath 
Following the riots at the temple, reports show that there were several cases of injuries, 23 vehicles were destroyed by rioters as well as damage to a police MPV, a fire engine, several other vehicles and property around the temple site and nearby developer premises. As of December 8, 2018, the official report from police stated that 106 arrests had been made to assist in the investigation.

A day after the second riot, there were reports that two law firms representing the developer had hired thugs who broke into the temple thus causing the first riot. This is further denied by the firms in question who reportedly represented the developer in its injunction against the temple. On November 29, 2019, the Inspector General of Police reportedly said that a lawyer arrested in connection with the riot was an adviser to the developer. Apart from that, the police investigation also found that only 50 men were involved in the attack on the temple, instead of 250 people as alleged by the Chairman of the Temple Action Body, S. Ramaji.

Earlier, after the first riots subsided, Minister of Unity and Social Welfare, P. Waytha Moorthy who led a press conference at the Parliament lobby on 26 November 2018 was reported to have said that police delays and their ineffective actions had made the riot incidents uncontrollable. He also claimed that the statement issued by the Subang Jaya District Police that the cause of the riot was a misunderstanding between the two Indian groups over the relocation of the temple was false. The statement issued by P. Waytha Moorthy was deemed inflammatory, causing an investigation to be carried out against him by the authorities. Opposition lawmakers had previously urged him to resign or be fired as a result of his actions saying some things were seen as defamatory of the previous Malaysian government in an old video as well as the hotly debated International Convention on the Elimination of Racial Discrimination (ICERD) issues at the time.

The demand for the resignation of P. Waytha Moorthy gained heightened attention in several protests causing Tun Dr Mahathir Mohamad to respond to the demand publicly by stating that it remains the prerogative of the Prime Minister to determine the post of P. Waytha Moorthy. In response, an NGO known as Jaringan Melayu Malaysia (JMM) organized a protest involving about 5,000 people in the Klang on December 25, 2018, a week after the death of Adib. The purpose of the protest was to demand justice for Adib's death and also demanded that P. Waytha Moorthy resign as Unity Minister in connection with the temple riots incident in November. Wanted their claims to be heard, the President of the Jaringan Melayu Malaysia, Azwanddin Hamzah's call for 'storming the police station' if no action is taken. As a result, on 26 December 2018, the police arrested the president of the organization for his provocative speech during a protest held the previous day in Klang.

On 11 February 2019, the inquest into Muhammad Adib's death began to investigate the cause of the death of the firefighter.  The inquest proceedings ended on September 27, 2019, when the Shah Alam Coroner's Court, Selangor ruled that the cause of Adib's death was due to criminal acts by two or more unknown individuals.

See also 

 2001 Kampung Medan riots
 13 May incident
 2018 in Malaysia

References

Further reading 

 
 
 
 

Riots and civil disorder in Malaysia
2018 in Malaysia
2018 riots
History of Selangor